Elodia is the sixth studio album by German duet Lacrimosa. It was released on 6 July 1999 via Hall of Sermon label.

Background
Elodia is a concept album and a rock opera, divided into three acts. The first act describes a love that is slowly being overwhelmed; the second act describes the act of separation itself, while the third act begins with a requiem, "Sanctus", before ending on a note of hope.

Elodia was an important point in the development of Lacrimosa's music into more classical areas, with the London Symphony Orchestra, the Rosenberg Ensemble and the Hamburg State Opera contributing to the orchestral side. "Sanctus" is a particular example of this, as it is based on the Christian liturgy of the same name, and dominated by the choral vocals of the Rosenberg Ensemble. It is not entirely an orchestral work, as it includes a section of Tilo Wolff's vocals and a guitar solo; it did, however, pave the way for the track "Kyrie" on Lacrimosa's eighth album Echos, which was entirely a classical work.

The song "The Turning Point" starts with Anne Nurmi saying a small poem in Finnish. The poem is "Poutaiset pilvet haihtuvat. Katoan nopeasti tuulten mukana, kuin tämä uni, jossa en enää sinua tavoita", and roughly translates to "The white clouds are fading. I disappear quickly with the winds, as this dream, in which I no longer reach you".

Reception

The German Terrorverlag magazine wrote a positive review that lauded the sentimental lyrics and Anne Nurmi's expressive vocals. Especially "Turning Point" is seen as a review of Nurmi's inner self. The author concluded that the album was definitely a great step in the band's evolution and awarded the album ten out of ten points.

Elodia stayed in the German album charts for ten weeks, peaking at position 12.

Track listing

© & ℗ 1999 Hall Of Sermon GmbH.

Personnel 

Tilo Wolff – Arranger, Producer, vocals, keyboards
Anne Nurmi – vocals, keyboards
Jay P. – lead guitar, bass
Sascha Gerbig – rhythm guitar
Mr AC (Rüdiger Dreffein) – drums
Thomas Gramatzki – clarinet, flute
Anja-Christine Hitzer – celli
Gottfried Koch – acoustic guitar
David Snell – Director
Featuring – The London Symphony Orchestra

References

External Links
 

Lacrimosa (band) albums
1999 albums
Rock operas
Concept albums